Cassiope tetragona (common names include Arctic bell-heather, white Arctic mountain heather and Arctic white heather) is a plant native to the high Arctic and northern Norway, where it is found widely.

Growing to 10–20 cm in height, it is a strongly branched dwarf shrub. The leaves are grooved, evergreen, and scale-like in four rows. Pedicels are long and arched. The plant bears bell-shaped, solitary flowers usually with white and pink lobes and pink anthers. The flower stalks and sepals are red, but the petals may also be yellowish-white. The anthers can also be brownish-yellow and flower stalks and sepals yellowish-green.
	

It grows on ridges and heaths, often in abundance and forming a distinctive and attractive plant community.

In Greenland, indigenous peoples use the plant as important source of fuel. Because of high resin content, it burns even when wet.

The plant can also be used in cooking.  Canadian chef Louis Charest used arctic heather as a smoked herb for the 2016 Three Amigos Summit state dinner.

See also
Flora of Svalbard

References

	 	

Ericaceae
Flora of Eastern Canada
Flora of Eastern Europe
Flora of Northern Europe
Flora of Siberia
Flora of Subarctic America
Flora of the Russian Far East
Flora of Western Canada
Flora without expected TNC conservation status